Goryayevo is a rural locality (a village) in Parfyonovskoye Rural Settlement, Velikoustyugsky District, Vologda Oblast, Russia. The population was 13 as of 2002.

Geography 
Goryayevo is located 32 km southeast of Veliky Ustyug (the district's administrative centre) by road. Kurakino is the nearest rural locality.

References 

Rural localities in Velikoustyugsky District